Opus is the tenth Spanish-language and twelfth studio album by American recording artist Marc Anthony, released on May 10, 2019, by Sony Music Latin. It is his first album since 3.0 (2013).

The album debuted at number 90 on the Billboard 200, number 2 on the Top Latin Albums and number 1 on the Tropical Albums chart with 9,000 album equivalent units.

Accolades

Track listing

Charts

Weekly charts

Year-end charts

Certifications

See also
 2019 in Latin music
 List of Billboard Tropical Albums number ones from the 2010s

References

2019 albums
Marc Anthony albums
Albums produced by Sergio George
Sony Music Latin albums
Grammy Award for Best Tropical Latin Album